Büşra Nur Tırıklı (born 7 December 1994) is a Turkish Paralympian athlete competing in the F11 disability class of discus throw event. She is a member of Gaziantep BB Disabled SK.

She won the silver medal in the discus throw F11/12 event at the 2016 IPC Athletics European Championships held in Grosseto, Italy.

She competed in the discus throw F11 at the 2016 Paralympics in Rio de Janeiro, Brazil after receiving a special invitation.

References

1994 births
Living people
Female competitors in athletics with disabilities
Turkish blind people
Visually impaired discus throwers
Turkish female discus throwers
Paralympic athletes of Turkey
Athletes (track and field) at the 2016 Summer Paralympics
Sportspeople from Gaziantep
21st-century Turkish sportswomen